Our Casuarina Tree is a poem published in 1881 by Toru Dutt [Ancient Ballads and Legends of Hindustan], an Indian poet.  In this poem Toru Dutt celebrates the majesty of the Casuarina Tree that she used to see by her window, and remembers her happy childhood days spent under it and revives her memories with her beloved siblings.

Summary

The poem begins with the
description  of the tree.The poet says that the creeper has wound itself around the rugged trunk of the Casuarina Tree, like a huge Python. The creeper has left deep marks on the trunk of the tree. The tree is so strong that it bears the tight hold of the creeper. The tree is described as being gallant, and possibly brave, as very few trees could survive in the strangle-hold of this creeper. The poet then goes on to describe the life that thrives amidst every facet of the tree. The tree is metaphorically said as a giant due to its huge size, strength and boldness. The Casuarina Tree is covered with creeper which bears red crimson flowers which appear as though the tree is wearing a colorful scarf. Often at night, the garden echoes and it seems to be jubilant and the song (of a nightingale) has no end; it continues till dawn. At dawn when the poet opens her window she is delighted to see the Casuarina Tree. Mostly in winters a gray baboon is seen sitting on the crest of the tree seeing the sunrise with her younger ones leaping and playing in the tree's boughs. The shadow of the tree appears to fall on the huge water tank. Toru Dutt says that it is not because of the majestic appearance of the Casuarina Tree that it is dear to her heart and soul, but also that she along with her siblings spent happy moments under it. Toru Dutt has brought out the theme of nature as something that shares feelings with humans, that lightens the burden on the heart. The poet continues with a description of how strong the image of the tree is, even when in lands far away. Even in France and Italy (where the poet studied), she can hear the tree's lament. The poet wishes to consecrate the tree's memory and importance for the sake of those who are now dead - and looks ahead to her own death, hoping that the tree be spared obscurity (or that no-one will remember it). She immortalizes the tree through this poem like how Wordsworth sanctified the Yew trees of Borrowdale. She says "May Love defend thee from Oblivion's curse'"- expressing her wish that love shield her tree against the curse of forgetfulness(Oblivion), that the tree be remembered out of love and not because it cannot be forgotten( Oblivion's curse, the inability to be forgotten).

Synopsis
Our Casuarina Tree is an autobiographical poem . While living abroad, she is pining for the scenes of her native land and reliving the memories of childhood. In the first part of the poem the poet depicts the Casuarina Tree trailed by a creeper vine like a huge python, winding round and round the rough trunk, sunken deep with scars . It reached to the height touching the very summit of stars. The Casuarina Tree stood alone unaccompanied in the compound. It was wearing the scarf of the creeper hung with crimson cluster of flowers among the boughs accompanied by the bird and swarms of bees humming around. The tree is dear to the poet because it is the solo bond between the poet's past and present. When she recalls it a chain of pleasant and poignant memories occur to her mind and again she tastes the flavour of her childhood. In her imagination she is again transported to the golden age and hears the same cries, laughter and noise of her sweet departed playmates. This tree reminds of her siblings who used to play with her under itself (Casuarina Tree).

Analysis
In this poem, Toru Dutt sings glories of the Casuarina tree and describes it in detail. On the surface of it, it appears that it is all about the Casuarina tree, but actually the tree is just a medium to link the poet's past with the present. The poet remembers the tree because of the many happy memories of childhood days that are linked to it which are a source of comfort and consolation to her in another country. The poem, therefore, underlines the importance of memories in human life. The tree brings to her mind the memories of time when she used to play under it in the company of her brother and sister, both of whom are already dead. She was very close to her dead brother and sister named Abju and Aru respectively who loved the Casuarina tree very greatly. So she loves the tree greatly. But lost in the memories of her siblings who are now dead, she is looking forward to death as an acceptable thing. The memories of her brother and sister brings tears into her eyes. She hopes that the tree will be remembered for ever as the yew trees of Borrowdale immortalized by Wordsworth are still remembered. She immortalizes the tree for the sake of her loved ones by writing a poem for it.

References

External links

Our Casuarina Tree

1881 poems
Indian poems
Poems